EpiBone is a biomedical engineering company that is developing technology to create bone tissue from a patient's mesenchymal stem cells in vitro for use in bone grafts. The company was founded by Nina Tandon and Sarindr “Ik” Bhumiratana.

References

Biomedical engineering
Prosthetics